The 2003 Craven District Council election took place on 1 May 2003 to elect members of Craven District Council in North Yorkshire, England. One third of the council was up for election and the council stayed under no overall control.

After the election, the composition of the council was:
Conservative 11
Independent 10
Liberal Democrats 9

Background
Before the election the Conservatives were the largest group with 13 seats, while there 9 Liberal Democrats and 8 independents. However the council was controlled by an alliance between independents and Liberal Democrats.

10 of the 30 seats on the council were elected in 2003, with the Conservatives defending 6, independents 3 and the Liberal Democrats defended 1 seat. Two of the three independents were re-elected without opposition.

Election result
Independents gained 2 seats from the Conservatives to mean there were 10 independent councillors on the council. The independent gains from the Conservatives came in Skipton East where Mike Hill was elected, and in West Craven where Robert Mason gained a seat. Meanwhile, another independent, Robert Heseltine, regained a seat on the council 3 years after having been forced to resign his seat due to being convicted of falsifying accounts, after defeating the sitting independent councillor Frances Cook by 217 votes in Skipton South.

Despite losing 2 seats the Conservatives remained the largest group on the council with 11 councillors, after holding another 4 seats. Meanwhile, the Liberal Democrats stayed on 9 seats, after holding the only seat they had been defending in Skipton West.

Ward results

By-elections between 2003 and 2004
A by-election was held in Bentham on 13 November 2003 after the resignation of Liberal Democrat councillor John Pilkington on his being charged by police with child pornography. The seat was gained by an independent Manuel Camacho with a majority of 107 votes over Conservative John Jackson.

References

2003
2003 English local elections
2000s in North Yorkshire